Sefiddasht (also Romanized as Sefīddasht, Sefīd Dasht, and Safīd Dasht) is a city in the Central District of Borujen County, Chaharmahal and Bakhtiari province, Iran, and serves as capital of the county. At the 2006 census, its population was 5,880 in 1,333 households. The following census in 2011 counted 5,561 people in 1,421 households. The latest census in 2016 showed a population of 5,471 people in 1,542 households. The village is populated by Turkic people.

References 

Borujen County

Cities in Chaharmahal and Bakhtiari Province

Populated places in Chaharmahal and Bakhtiari Province

Populated places in Borujen County